The following is a list of notable Kenyan rappers:

 Abbas Kubaff
 Bali Brahmbhatt
 Jua Cali
 K-rupt 
 Nafsi Huru 
 Nonini
 Kaka Sungura
 Kayvo Kforce
 Monski
 Petra Bockle 
 Shrekeezy
 Stella Mwangi
 Wangechi

References 

Kenya